The Aird (from the Scottish Gaelic: An Àird (IPA:[ˈanˈaːɾʃt̪]) meaning "The High Place") is an area of the County of Inverness, to the west of the City of Inverness. It is situated to the south of the River Beauly and the Beauly Firth, and to the north of Glenurquhart and the northern end of Loch Ness.

Villages within the Aird include Kirkhill, Kiltarlity, Lentran and Inchmore.

It is the traditional heart of the Clan Fraser of Lovat's territory, containing their family seat of Beaufort Castle. The first known Lord of the Aird, however, was Iain Mac Eoin Nan Gleann or "John Bisset of the Glens" in English.

The area gives its name to a Highland Council ward - "Aird and Loch Ness".

History
Blar Nam Feinne ( is a site on Cnoc na Moine that reputedly saw a battle in the early 11th century between King Malcolm and Thorfinn of Norway.

The Aird is first documented as a provincial lordship between 1203 and 1221. It only survived as a single territory until 1259, when it was divided among the three female heirs of John Bissett of Lovat and their husbands.

The extent of the lordship is uncertain. It can be shown to have included the parishes of Convinth, Farnua, Kiltarlity, and Dunballoch, which all lay within the Province of Moray, and may also have included the parish of Glenelg on the west coast. Uniquely among Moravian lordships it may also have included land outside the province, including Edirdovar (now Redcastle) on the Black Isle, and land within the parish of Kilmorack, both of which lay within the Province of Ross.

The Aird is also supposed to be the site of the defeat of Donald Balloch in the 15th century. Various cairns marked the burials from the battles, about 20 mounds have survived forestry operations with varying degrees of mutilation.

References

Bibliography

See also
Beauly, The Aird and Strathglass Place-Name Survey
 A Vision of Britain through Time

Clan Fraser
Geography of Highland (council area)
Provincial lordships of Scotland
Clan Bissett